Aaron Grabau (born 8 February 1978) is an Australian former professional basketball player. He played 14 seasons for the Cairns Taipans of the National Basketball League (NBL).

Grabau was born in Melbourne, Victoria. He made his NBL debut as an 18-year-old with the Geelong Supercats in the 1996 season. He joined the Cairns Taipans in 1999. Grabau retired in 2013 as the Taipans all-time leader in rebounds, steals and games played. His number 8 was retired by the team in 2019.

At a state level, Grabau played for the Dandenong Rangers in 1996 and Mackay Meteors in 1997. In 1998, he joined the Cairns Marlins and won the state and national championships during his first season. Grabau won state championships with the Marlins in 2001, 2004, 2007 and 2009.

Grabau works as a Senior Constable with the Queensland Police Service.

References

1978 births

Living people
Australian men's basketball players
Basketball players from Melbourne
Cairns Taipans players
Geelong Supercats players
Guards (basketball)
Queensland police officers